is a Japanese actor, entertainer and model. He is best known for his roles as Kohei Kitahanada in Fuji TV's Hanazakari no Kimitachi e/Ikemen Paradise drama, Otoya Kurenai and Kazumi Sawatari in TV Asahi's tokusatsu series Kamen Rider Kiva and Kamen Rider Build, and the voice of Vaan in Final Fantasy XII. In 2001, he received the 14th "Super Boy JUNON contest" special jury award. He is a former member of the PureBOYS.

Filmography

TV 
 Chouseishin Gransazer (Tv Series 2003) As Ken Shindo Sazer Lion
Otouto (TV Asahi, 2004) 
Shichinin no Onna Bengoshi (TV Asahi, 2006) as Masato Todo
My Boss My Hero (NTV, 2006) as Ryusuke Hiratsuka
Oniyome Nikki 2 (Fuji TV, 2007)  
Hanazakari no Kimitachi e / Ikemen♂Paradise (Fuji TV, 2007) as Kohei Kitahanada
Tadashii Ouji no Tsukuri Kata (TV Tokyo, 2008) as Hayato Noda
Kamen Rider Kiva (TV Asahi, 2008) as Otoya Kurenai, Masao Kurenai
Kamen Rider Decade (TV Asahi, 2009) as Otoya Kurenai
Sengoku Basara: Moonlight Party (2012) as Sanada Yukimura
Gunshi Kanbei (2014) as Ukita Hideie
Hotel Concierge (TBS, 2015) as Yudai Tango
HiGH&LOW Season 2 (2016) as Hirai
Kamen Rider Build (TV Asahi, 2017) as Kazumi Sawatari/Kamen Rider Grease

Movie 

Summer Nude (2002)
Shudan Satsujin Club (2004) 
TKO HIPHOP (2005) as Masashi Oota
Goya-champuru (2006) (named for the Okinawan dish Goya champuru)
Akanezora (2007) as Taro Sakai
Waruboro (2007)  
Crows Zero : Extra's (????)
Kamen Rider Den-O & Kiva: Climax Deka (2008) as Otoya Kurenai
Kamen Rider Kiva: King of the Castle in the Demon World (2008) as Otoya Kurenai
ROOKIES The Movie: Graduation (2009) as Sadaharu Kawakami
Kotodama – Spiritual Curse (2014)
High&Low The Movie (2016) as Hirai
High&Low The Movie 2 / End of Sky (2017) as Hirai
High&Low The Movie 3 / Final Mission (2017) as Hirai
Kamen Rider Build: Be the One (2018) as Kazumi Sawatari
Kamen Rider Heisei Generations Forever (2018) as Kazumi Sawatari
Tyida (2022) as Ryōta
Kono Chiisana Te (2023)

Other 

Final Fantasy XII (2006) as Vaan (voice)

Stage 

7Cheers!~Tobe! Jibun To Iu Daichi Kara~ [with PureBOYS] (2007,October 3)
Hakuouki Shinsengumi Kitan Stage Play as Toudou Heisuke

CD 
"With Me" (2008) with Crimson-Fang
"This love never ends" (2008)
"Inherited-System" (2008) with Yu Takahashi, Keisuke Kato, and Nana Yanagisawa
"Supernova Love Edit." (2009) with Tetra-Fang
"Beginning~Message3" (2009) with Kōji Seto

Photobooks 

 CRUISE (March 2009)

CM 

Suntory [C.C. Lemon]

References

External links 
 Official website

Japanese male film actors
Japanese male television actors
1986 births
Living people